Benbrook Middle-High School (BMHS) is a combined middle and high school in Benbrook, Texas. It is within the Fort Worth Independent School District. It is southeast of Westpark Elementary School and situated in a  building on a  plot of land.

History
It opened as Benbrook Middle School in August 2011; a 2007 bond paid for the $39 million facility. VLK Architects, Inc. served as the architect, AECOM was the program manager, and General Contractor Thomas S. Bryne was the builder. In 2014 the 9th-grade class began operation and the school became a mixed middle and high school; this was the result of a 2013 ballot measure within the FWISD bond.

Students 
Benbrook Middle-High School serves about 1,598 students and enrollment has been increasing since 2012. 50.4% of their students are white, 37.6% Hispanic, 6.7% African American, and 5.3% of students are either mixed, Asian, American Indian, or Pacific Islander. A little over 40% of their students receive free or discounted lunch. There is a 16.8 student to teacher ratio at BMHS.

References

External links
 Benbrook Middle-High School
 Benbrook Middle-High School PTA
 Benbrook Middle-High School Library

Fort Worth Independent School District high schools
Fort Worth Independent School District schools
Public middle schools in Texas
2011 establishments in Texas
Educational institutions established in 2011